Summer Shaw is a fictional character from the British Channel 4 soap opera Hollyoaks, played by Summer Strallen. The character is most notable for being "planted" in the show as publicity for an Andrew Lloyd Webber produced stage production of The Sound of Music. Making national headlines, Summer the fictional character won the same leading role of Maria that Strallen had been cast as in the West End show.

Storylines
Summer arrives as an undergraduate at Hollyoaks Community College who has moved to Chester and who seems to have an interfering mother constantly phoning her to check if she is okay. John Paul and Katy spot her conversing with her mother on the phone and realise a pair of underwear has dropped from her suitcase as she gathers her bags and walks off to find the admissions office. John Paul screams for her but she does not hear him. Later, while dining at Il Gnosh the two spot her again where John Paul timidly returns the pair of underwear to her and introduces himself. The two strike up a friendship and while walking through the college, she talks lots about herself and her passion for the performing arts. John Paul invites her for a drink, which Katy does not join them, probably as she finds her a bit full on. While John Paul strikes up a conversation with Jay, Summer befriends Russ while sitting at the bar.

While attending John Paul's housewarming party at the halls, Summer caught the eye of Kris Fisher. The carbon monoxide leak from the faulty boiler rendered her unconscious along with all the other people in the party, Summer was drowsy but recovered at the scene, she was given the all clear by doctors and was told to go home. At a swimming pool in which O.B. had taken Tom to teach him how to swim O.B. saw Summer and started chatting her up. He was so busy talking to her that he didn't notice Tom taking his armbands off before jumping in and having to be saved by Simon Crosby. Summer then started working at MOBs where it was obvious that O.B. had a crush on her and she clashed with Max Cunningham's girlfriend Steph Dean who she worked with and originally met after they both went for a part to star in a health and safety video.

After running into Nancy Hayton and Sarah Barnes, the trio decided to go for a drink. When a guy walked into the SU Bar, when Sarah said "Ooh,I'd have a bit of that!",where Nancy replied "No,he's not my type", before Summer noticed him, and called out "James!" Nancy and Sarah both looked horrified by what they said.

James, Summer's long-term boyfriend, is in the Army and tells Summer he's on leave because he is to spend five months in Afghanistan - and he leaves the next day. Summer considered asking him to stay, before a heart-to-heart with Sarah, who asked her "what if you landed a part in a Broadway show?" "I'd ask him to come with me" "For him to drop everything to follow your dreams, when you wouldn't let him follow his?" Summer understood that she couldn't have it all her way, and let him go, after telling him "if you get yourself killed out there I'll murder you!" "You say that every time!" The pair kiss, and James left in a taxi.

On the 15 November 2007 Summer received a phone call from James. After the credits had ended she was crying and told O.B. that it was over between her and James, she ran off leaving O.B. alone at The Dog in The Pond.

Summer recently shared a kiss with Kris Fisher after their radio show was taken over by 'pirates' aka John Paul McQueen and Elliot Bevan. But then it was revealed that they are a couple when she tells OB "I never would have thought I would have a boyfriend who looked better than me in lipgloss."

However, after realising her feelings for OB, she breaks up with Kris claiming he is too high maintenance. This results in quite a nasty argument between them - Kris calling Summer shallow while Summer stated that cross-dressing didn't make him any more special, and that he 'wakes up in the morning and thinks, who shall I be today, male or female?'
Later Kris sees Summer having lunch with OB and is angry, but when OB defends her Kris and OB 'fight', ending in Summer pouring water over them.

On 25 January 2008, after Steph suggested that they should form a band, Summer decided she'd had enough of life in Hollyoaks and wanted to try her luck at living in London. She wanted to be able to chase her dreams and not wait for the opportunities to come to her. She asked O.B. to go with her but he refused saying that he couldn't let Max down by leaving. After one last-ditch attempt to convince O.B. to come with her, she walked out the door.

Later, Max convinced O.B. to leave with Summer, saying that she is the best thing that's ever happened to him. They race to the bus station in the MOBs van, arriving just as the bus is about to leave. O.B. hopped on the bus and tells Summer that she only asked him twice to leave and everyone knows that it's three times for luck. After a hug and a kiss, they departed for London with Max looking on.

After arriving in London, Summer sets about trying to find Andrew Lloyd Webber so that she can try to get a part in one of his musicals.

On 1 February 2008, despite her nerves during an audition, Summer has successfully been offered a part of Maria in The Sound Of Music, one of Andrew Lloyd Webber's musicals.

On 15 February 2008, Summer made her exit from Hollyoaks, leading a new life to star in one of Andrew Lloyd Webber's musicals. But with O.B.'s second thoughts about moving out, Summer realises she has to start a new life alone, even without him.

On 28 February 2008, O.B. chased his dream and him and Summer got back together, with him remaining in London with her to start their new life. This is the last time she is seen onscreen.

References

 

Hollyoaks characters
Television characters introduced in 2007
Female characters in television